Tyler Tucker (born March 1, 2000) is a Canadian professional ice hockey defenceman playing with the Springfield Thunderbirds in the American Hockey League (AHL) as a prospect to the St. Louis blues of the National Hockey League (NHL). He was selected by the Blues in the seventh round, 200th overall, of the 2018 NHL Entry Draft.

Playing career 
Tucker played major junior hockey with the Barrie Colts in the Ontario Hockey League (OHL) before he was selected in his first year of eligibility in the 2018 NHL Entry Draft by the St. Louis Blues, 200th overall. He made his professional debut at conclusion of the 2018–19 season, signing an amateur tryout with the Blues then AHL affiliate, the San Antonio Rampage, on April 7, 2019.

During his final season of major junior hockey in 2019–20, Tucker was traded by the Colts to the Flint Firebirds on January 7, 2020. He finished with a career best 17 goals in a combined 55 regular season games before the playoffs were cancelled due to the COVID-19 pandemic.

On March 3, 2020, Tucker was signed by the St. Louis Blues to a three-year, entry-level contract. Embarking on his first professional season, Tucker was eventually assigned to the Blues temporary AHL affiliate, the Utica Comets, for the pandemic-shortened 2020–21 season. He registered 7 points through 27 appearances with the Comets.

After contributing with 7 points through his first 11 games, Tucker was recalled by the Blues and later made his NHL debut on St. Louis' third-pairing in a 5–2 victory over the Chicago Blackhawks on November 16, 2022.

Personal life
Tyler has a twin brother, Jesse, who plays at the collegiate level with Michigan State University.

Career statistics

References

External links
 

2000 births
Living people
Barrie Colts players
Flint Firebirds players
St. Louis Blues draft picks
St. Louis Blues players
San Antonio Rampage players
Springfield Thunderbirds players
Utica Comets players